Chasmocranus is a genus of three-barbeled catfishes native to South America.

Species 
There are currently 10 recognized species in this genus:
 Chasmocranus brachynemus A. L. Gomes & Schubart, 1958
 Chasmocranus brevior C. H. Eigenmann, 1912
 Chasmocranus chimantanus Inger, 1956
 Chasmocranus longior C. H. Eigenmann, 1912
 Chasmocranus lopezi P. Miranda-Ribeiro, 1968
 Chasmocranus peruanus C. H. Eigenmann & N. E. Pearson, 1942
 Chasmocranus quadrizonatus N. E. Pearson, 1937
 Chasmocranus rosae C. H. Eigenmann, 1922
 Chasmocranus surinamensis (Bleeker, 1862)
 Chasmocranus truncatorostris Borodin, 1927

References

Heptapteridae
Fish of South America
Catfish genera
Taxa named by Carl H. Eigenmann
Freshwater fish genera